Beck is a surname of both Germanic and Hebrew origin , meaning "brook", "stream" (related to Old Norse bekkr) or "martyr" (Hebrew) and is fairly common in English and Slavic speaking countries, Germany (equivalent to Bach) and Denmark. The German name can also be a variant of Becker, which is an occupational surname meaning "baker". In Hebrew, it exists as an abbreviated form of B'nei Kiddoshim ("sons of the martyrs"). In some Slavic countries such as the former Yugoslavia and Russia it is spelled as Bek.

Notable people
Notable people with this surname include:
 Aaron T. Beck (1921–2021), founder of cognitive therapy
 Adam Beck (1857–1925), Canadian politician and hydro-electricity advocate
 Adolf Beck (1841–1909), Norwegian immigrant wrongly convicted of fraud in England
 Adolf Beck (physiologist) (1863–1942), Polish professor at University of Lwow
 András Beck (1911–1985), Hungarian sculptor
 Andreas Beck (footballer) (born 1987), German football player
 Andreas Beck (tennis) (born 1986), German tennis player
 Andrew Beck (American football) (born 1996), American football player
 Andrew Beck (musician) (born 1986), American artist and musician, member of the band The Mellons
 Audrey P. Beck (1931–1983), American educator and politician
 Bill Beck (1900–1965), American college sports coach
 C. C. Beck (1910–1989), American cartoonist
 Charlie Beck (born 1953), Chief of the Los Angeles Police Department
 Christophe Beck (born 1968/1969), Canadian composer for Buffy the Vampire Slayer
 Claude Beck (1894–1971), American cardiac surgeon who invented the defibrillator
 Clifford W. Beck (1908–1985), American politician
 Corey Beck (born 1971), American basketball player
 Dave Beck (1894–1993), American labor leader
 David Beck  (1621–1656), Dutch portrait painter
 David Beck (musician), Australian drummer 
 David B. Beck (PhD 2012), American physician-scientist
 David L. Beck (born 1953), Mormon leader
 Diana Beck (1900–1956), English neurosurgeon 
 Doris Beck (1929–2020), American politician
 "Dr. Beck", name taken by the Count de Werdinsky (1803–1856)
 Franz Ignaz Beck (1734–1809), German classical composer
 Franz Ignaz von Beecke (1733–1803), German classical composer
 Gad Beck (1923–2012), German educator, author, activist, and survivor of the Holocaust
 Geoffrey Beck (cricketer) (1918–2019), English cricketer, minister, and centenarian
 George Beck (artist) (1749–1812), artist and poet
 Gina Beck (born 1981), English actress and singer
 Glenn Beck (born 1964), American political commentator, radio host, and television producer
 Günther Beck von Mannagetta und Lerchenau (1856–1931), German botanist
 Hans Beck (1929–2009), German inventor
 Harry Beck (1902–1974), designer of the London Underground map
 Harry Beck (footballer) (1901–1979), English footballer
 Henrik Henriksen Beck (1799–1863), Danish geologist, conchologist and naturalist
 Ivan Bek (1909–1963), Yugoslav footballer
 Jackson Beck (1912–2004), American actor and announcer
 Jakob Sigismund Beck, German philosopher
 James Beck (1929–1973), English actor in the television series Dad's Army
 James Beck (art historian) (1930–2007), American art historian
 James B. Beck (1822–1890), American congressman from Kentucky
 James M. Beck (1861–1936), United States Solicitor General and US Congressman from Pennsylvania
 Jeff Beck (1944–2023), British electric guitarist
 Joe Beck (1945–2008), American jazz guitarist
 John Beck (actor) (born 1943), American actor
 John Beck (footballer) (born 1954), British football manager
 John Beck (gridiron football) (born 1981), NFL player and former BYU quarterback
 John Brodhead Beck (1794–1851), 19th-century United States physician
 Jonathan Mock Beck (1935–2006), American mathematician
 Joko Beck (1917–2011), an American Zen teacher
 Józef Beck (1894–1944), Polish diplomat and military officer
 József Beck (born 1952), mathematician
 Justin Beck, American guitarist
 Karol Beck (born 1982), Slovak tennis player
 Ken Beck (born 1940), Australian Rules footballer
 Kent Beck (born 1961), proponent of Extreme Programming
 Kimberly Beck (born 1956), American actress
 Kristin Beck (born 1966), retired American Navy SEAL
 Kurt Beck (born 1949), German politician (SPD)
 Laetitia Beck (born 1992), Israeli golfer
 Lewis Caleb Beck (1798–1853), American naturalist and physician
 Ludwig Beck (1880–1944), German general in Hitler assassination attempt
 Margit Beck (1918–1997), Hungarian-born American painter
 Mark Beck (born 1994), footballer
 Michael Beck (born 1949), American actor
 Mikkel Beck (born 1973), Danish professional football player
 Nissan Beck or Nisan Bak (1815–1889), Hasidic leader, moderniser and printer in Jerusalem
 Noah Beck (born 2001), American social medial personality
 Paul W. Beck (1876–1922), American military aviation pioneer
 Peter Beck (disambiguation) - various people
 Richard Beck (scholar) (1897–1980), American literary historian
 Rick Beck (born 1956), member of the Arkansas House of Representatives
 Robert Beck, alias of African American writer Iceberg Slim
 Robert Beck, alias of D-12 rapper Karnail Pitts
 Robert Nason Beck (1928–2008), pioneer radiologist
 Robin Beck (born 1954), American singer
 Rod Beck (1968–2007), relief pitcher in Major League Baseball
 Rollo Beck (1870–1950), American bird collector
 Stanley D. Beck (1919–1997), American entomologist
 Theodore Beck, first principal of the MAO College at Aligarh, India
 Theodric Romeyn Beck (1859–1899), forensic scientist
 Ulrich Beck (1944–2015), German sociologist
 W. Raymond Beck (1932–2014), member of Maryland House of Delegates
 William E. Beck (1842—1892), Chief Justice of the Colorado Supreme Court

Fictional characters
Martin Beck, Swedish police detective in the Sjöwall and Wahlöö novels
Beck Oliver, one of the main characters from Victorious
Florian Beck, one of the main characters from Salt to the Sea
Guinevere Beck, character from the television series You
Tom Beck, a character in the 1998 American science-fiction disaster movie Deep Impact
 Finley Beck, a fictional photographer appearing in the season two episode of Charmed (1998), "Chick Flick". 
Quentin Beck, one of Spiderman’s enemies.
Dr. Christopher "Chris" Beck, one of the main characters from The Martian (film) and The Martian (Weir novel)

References

See also
 Bak
 Verbeek

Danish-language surnames
English-language surnames
German-language surnames
Surnames of Liechtenstein origin